Alcaligenes aaquatilis is a Gram-negative, catalase- and cytochrome oxidase-positive, motile bacterium with peritrichous flagella, from the genus Alcaligenes, which was isolated in Germany from sediments of the Weser Estuary and in Shem Creek in Charleston Harbor in the United States from a salt marsh. A complete genome sequence of A. aquatilis is publicly available in DNA Data Bank of Japan, European Nucleotide Archive, and GenBank.

References

External links	
Type strain of Alcaligenes aquatilis at BacDive -  the Bacterial Diversity Metadatabase

Burkholderiales
Bacteria described in 2005